Spotted rattler may refer to:

 Sistrurus catenatus, also known as the massasauga, a venomous pitviper species found primarily in the United States
 Sistrurus miliarius, also known as the pigmy rattlesnake, a venomous pitviper species found in the southeastern United States

Animal common name disambiguation pages